Como Lake is a small lake in Como Lake Park in the city of Coquitlam, British Columbia.

It forms the headwaters of the Como watershed and is an urban fishing and recreation area in the city of Coquitlam as well as the Lower Mainland.

The lake is very popular with joggers and walkers, the trail around the lake being 1 km in length. There are small stocked rainbow trout, carp, and catfish living in the lake.

References

External links
Como Watershed Group
Fraser Valley Guide

Landforms of Coquitlam
Como
New Westminster Land District